Radisson is a provincial electoral division in the Canadian province of Manitoba.  It was created by redistribution in 1957, and has formally existed since the 1958 provincial election.  The riding is located in the northeastern section of the City of Winnipeg and is named after Pierre-Esprit Radisson, a seventeenth-century explorer.

Radisson is bordered on the east by Transcona and Springfield, to the south by Southdale, to the north by River East, and to the west by Rossmere, Concordia and St. Boniface.  The Canadian National Railway Symington Yards are in the southern part of the riding.

The riding's population in 1996 was 20,113.  In 1999, the average family income was $54084, and the unemployment rate was 4.60%.  Radisson's francophone population is 9%, and there are also significant Ukrainian (7%) and German (6%) communities.

Manufacturing accounts for 14% of Radisson's industry, with a further 13% in the retail trade.

New Democratic Party MLA and former party leader Russell Paulley represented the riding for many years, although the boundaries changed dramatically with the 1998 redistribution. The Progressive Conservatives won the riding in 1977, and the Liberals did the same in 1988. In both cases, the NDP regained the seat after a single term.

Members of the Legislative Assembly
This riding has elected the following MLAs:

Electoral results

1958 general election

1959 general election

1962 general election

1966 general election

1969 general election

1973 general election

1977 general election

1981 general election

1986 general election

1988 general election

1990 general election

1995 general election

1999 general election

2003 general election

2007 general election

2011 general election

2016 general election

2019 general election

Previous boundaries

References

Manitoba provincial electoral districts
Politics of Winnipeg